"The Denial Twist" is the third single released from American alternative rock band the White Stripes' fifth studio album, Get Behind Me Satan (2005).

Music video
The music video for "The Denial Twist" was directed by Michel Gondry.  Like some of his previous work (namely The Chemical Brothers' "Let Forever Be" and Kylie Minogue's "Come Into My World"), the video features a spectacular array of visual effects as it follows The White Stripes from a talk show performance to a late night drive back to an apartment. As the camera pans in a circle, Jack and Meg appear distorted. This refers to the lyric of the song; that what people think is true is often shaped by the context in which information is presented to them and their willingness to be deceived—even by themselves—as various aspects of the video radically shift in perspective, size, proportion and believability. The choice of Late Night with Conan O'Brien as a setting for the video, aside from the band's personal association, is due to the lesser known fact that, like many film and TV sets, the Late Night stage looks much larger on television than it actually is.

The optical illusion used in the video is the technique of forced perspective, through an Ames room and distortions derived from it.

The creators of the distorted props, Jeff Everett and John Furgason, won a Music Video Production Association Award for Art Direction in 2006.

Conan O'Brien makes a cameo appearance in the video; The White Stripes had been a week-long musical guest on Late Night with Conan O'Brien when they were promoting Elephant. The square-headed O'Brien doll in the video was a reference to a similar one given to the comedian at the end of their week-long stay on the show. The plaster blow-up was actually created by Gondry.

This is Gondry's fourth video with The White Stripes, after "Fell in Love with a Girl", "Dead Leaves and the Dirty Ground" and "The Hardest Button to Button". The video can be found on the DVD compilation Michel Gondry 2: More Videos (Before and After DVD 1)

The song is also the final 3-inch record made for the triple inchophone. However, it was never on general sale and only Jack himself had them to give out to fans, friends and family. These 3-inch records are extremely rare and very few have ever come up for sale on eBay.

Track listings
 UK CD single and 7-inch single 1
 "The Denial Twist"
 "Shelter of Your Arms" (the Greenhornes cover)

 UK 7-inch single 2
 "The Denial Twist" (live on KCRW)
 "As Ugly as I Seem" (live on KCRW)

Personnel
 Jack White – vocals, guitar, piano
 Meg White – drums, percussion
 Eddie Gillis – tambourine, shakers

Charts

Release history

References

External links
 "The Denial Twist" video details (defunct link at the moment)

Twist (dance)
2005 singles
2005 songs
Blues rock songs
Music videos directed by Michel Gondry
Songs written by Jack White
UK Independent Singles Chart number-one singles
V2 Records singles
XL Recordings singles
The White Stripes songs